Luis Astolfi Pérez de Guzmán (born 18 April 1959) is a retired Spanish equestrian. He competed in individual and team jumping events at the 1984, 1988, 1992 and the 2000 Summer Olympics with the best individual result of tenth place in 1984.

References

External links
 

1959 births
Living people
Spanish male equestrians
Olympic equestrians of Spain
Equestrians at the 1984 Summer Olympics
Equestrians at the 1988 Summer Olympics
Equestrians at the 1992 Summer Olympics
Equestrians at the 2000 Summer Olympics
Competitors at the 1993 Mediterranean Games
Sportspeople from Seville
Mediterranean Games bronze medalists for Spain
Mediterranean Games medalists in equestrian